Jorge Coelho (17 July 1954 – 7 April 2021) was a Portuguese politician. He was a member of the Socialist Party.

Biography
Coelho earned a degree in business from the Technical University of Lisbon and an engineering degree from the University of Coimbra. After the Carnation Revolution, he was one of the founding members of the Popular Democratic Union, a Marxist-Leninist party. He then became active in the Socialist Party, led by Mário Soares.

From 1983 to 1985, Coelho served as Chief of Staff for Minister for Social Equipment, . In 1987, he was elected to the Assembly of the Republic, where he would serve until 2006. He simultaneously held several secretarial roles in Portuguese Macau during the 1990s. He was appointed Minister of Internal Administration on 25 November 1997 before becoming Minister of State on 10 September 2000. He resigned from all ministerial roles on 10 March 2001 after a bridge collapse in Castelo de Paiva, which was built under his administration as Minister of Internal Administration.

After he left the Assembly of the Republic, Coelho became a commentator on the political program . In 2008, he left the program to become CEO of the conglomerate Mota-Engil, serving until 2013.

Jorge Coelho died of a sudden heart attack while on vacation in Figueira da Foz on 7 April 2021 at the age of 66.

References

1954 births
2021 deaths
Portuguese politicians
Portuguese Marxists
Members of the Assembly of the Republic (Portugal)
Government ministers of Portugal
Socialist Party (Portugal) politicians
Technical University of Lisbon alumni
University of Coimbra alumni
People from Viseu